David Filoni (born June 7, 1974) is an American director, producer, screenwriter, and voice actor. He has worked on Avatar: The Last Airbender, The Mandalorian, and on the theatrical film and television series of Star Wars: The Clone Wars. He was also the creator and an executive producer on Star Wars Rebels for all four seasons, and served as its supervising director for all but the third season, in which Justin Ridge served as supervising director while Filoni accepted a promotion to oversee all of Lucasfilm Animation projects. Filoni is also credited as one of the writers and executive producers of the web series Star Wars Forces of Destiny, and as the creator of the 2018–2020 animated series Star Wars Resistance and the 2021 animated series Star Wars: The Bad Batch, which has been renewed for a second season.

Early life
Dave Filoni was born in Mt. Lebanon, Pennsylvania, a suburb of Pittsburgh, on June 7, 1974. He graduated from Mt. Lebanon High School in 1992 and Edinboro University of Pennsylvania in 1996. Filoni's father was an opera and a classical music fan, according to composer Kevin Kiner (who did most of the music for The Clone Wars and Rebels); as such, he inherited appreciation for classical music and helped with the collaboration process, with Kiner crediting Filoni for suggesting the organ in Grand Admiral Thrawn's theme from Rebels. Filoni has also said that his grandfather and uncle were pilots, with the latter specializing in restoring planes. He cited this as a significant influence with regard to the concept of Star Wars Resistance.

Career
Prior to his work with Lucasfilm Animation, Filoni worked as a storyboard artist and/or assistant director for various animated series, including Mike Judge's King of the Hill, Phil Walsh's Teamo Supremo, and Disney's Kim Possible, before moving on to direct many of Nickelodeon's first-season episodes of the animated series Avatar: The Last Airbender.

Star Wars
An avid Star Wars fan, particularly of character Plo Koon, Filoni dressed up as the Jedi Master for the opening of Revenge of the Sith. Filoni left Nickelodeon after George Lucas offered him a job, helping him develop a Star Wars animated series. While on The Star Wars Show, Filoni revealed that he originally believed he was being pranked when given the Star Wars job.

Filoni's office, as seen in the extra features on the Star Wars: The Clone Wars DVD, is filled with Plo Koon paraphernalia. He has a bust of Plo Koon's head, a model of Plo Koon's ship, an autographed portrait by the actor who played Plo Koon, a replica of Plo Koon's lightsaber on his desk, and his personal Plo Koon costume on display. Filoni also has a notebook-sized planner on his desk with Plo Koon's picture taped to the outside, and he has written the words "Plo Kool" on concept art designs for the Clone Wars, indicating that he liked those designs. Filoni also has a small model of the character Appa on his desk, from Avatar: The Last Airbender. Filoni has attended all the Clone Wars premieres and attended the fifth-season premiere in Orlando, Florida during the special event Celebration VI on August 24, 2012. He is most associated with developing the characters of Ahsoka Tano and Captain Rex.

Producing and directing
In 2008, he served as director of the Star Wars: The Clone Wars animated feature film, and the supervising director of the Star Wars: The Clone Wars animated series.

Filoni made an appearance at Celebration IV in May 2007 with producer Catherine Winder to discuss the beginnings of the new television series and reveal how The Clone Wars is being created. At the time, he announced he would be writing for the Clone Wars monthly comic. Filoni voices the bounty hunter Embo during various episodes in different seasons. In February 2009, Filoni was inducted as an Honorary Member of the 501st Legion international costuming organization in recognition of his contributions to the continuing Star Wars saga.

Filoni was as an executive producer of Star Wars Rebels, which debuted in fall 2014, alongside Greg Weisman and Simon Kinberg. For the first two seasons he also served as its supervising director. He appointed Justin Ridge as his successor for the remainder of the show, though he still remained as executive producer. Filoni departed as supervising director in September 2016 when he was given the job as overseer of all future and current Lucasfilm Animation projects. He returned as supervising director for season four.

In 2019, Jon Favreau invited Filoni to work with him to create The Mandalorian, a live action Star Wars television series that premiered on Disney+ in November 2019. Referred to as a "Lucas encyclopedia", he contributes to and consults on many aspects of the series' production and began influencing the direction of the story in season two. He is an executive producer of the show and made his live action debut as the director of episode one of the first season.

Promotion
In mid-2020, Lucasfilm quietly promoted Filoni as executive producer and executive creative director for the studio. His promotion was not announced to the public until Lucasfilm updated its list of their executives on its website with the addition of Filoni in May 2021.

Voice acting
Filoni provided the voice of the bounty hunter Embo and the droid CH-33P ("Cheep") in Star Wars: The Clone Wars. In the Star Wars Rebels season three episodes "The Holocrons of Fate" and "Legacy of Mandalore", Filoni voiced a Rebel Crewman, Stormtroopers, and Mandalorian Warrior, respectively. He also voiced Chopper for the entirety of the show, a fact not revealed until the series finale.

Acting
Filoni made his live action acting debut in The Mandalorian as an X-Wing pilot named Trapper Wolf in Chapter 6: The Prisoner. He later reprised the character in Chapter 10: The Passenger.

Filmography

Live-action credits

Animation credits

Episodic directing and writing credits

Bibliography

Accolades

Notes

References

External links
 

1974 births
Animators from Pennsylvania
American animated film directors
Edinboro University of Pennsylvania alumni
Film directors from Pennsylvania
Living people
Lucasfilm people
People from Mt. Lebanon, Pennsylvania